The  Little League World Series took place between August 18 and August 23 in Williamsport, Pennsylvania. The Taichung Little League of Taichung City, Taiwan, defeated the Briarwood Little League of Santa Clara, California, in the championship game of the 23rd Little League World Series.

Teams

Championship bracket

Consolation Bracket

Notable players
Carney Lansford of the Santa Clara team went on to play in MLB as a third baseman from 1978 through 1992

See also
Taitung Red Leaves

External links
1969 Little League World Series
Line scores for the 1969 LLWS

Little League World Series
Little League World Series
Little League World Series